The Story of Jang-hwa and Hong-ryeon (Dae Jang-hwa Hong-ryeon jeon) is a 1962 South Korean film directed by Jeong Chang-hwa. The film is based on a Korean folklore story called Janghwa Hongryeon jeon which had been adapted into film versions in 1924, 1936, 1956, 1962, 1972, 2003, and 2009.

Cast
Jo Mi-ryeong
Choi Nam-hyeon (최남현)
Um Aing-ran

References

External links

South Korean fantasy films
1962 films
Films based on fairy tales
Films directed by Jeong Chang-hwa